Crosfield Electronics was a British electronics imaging company founded by John Crosfield (1915 - 2012) and Dennis Bent in 1947 to produce process imaging devices for the print industry.  The firm was notable for its innovation in colour drum scanning in its Scanatron (1959) and later Magnascan (1969) products.

The company was acquired by De la Rue in 1974.

The firm was eventually taken over by Fujifilm Japan and named Fujifilm Electronic Imaging, now FFEI Ltd. following a management buy-out in 2008.

References

Sources 
Crosfield diary notes

Electronics companies of the United Kingdom
British companies established in 1947